Carl Olaf Sonne (April 16, 1882, Svaneke, Denmark – June 3, 1948, Copenhagen, Denmark) was a Danish bacteriologist and parasitologist who discovered the Shigella sonnei strain of shigella bacterium.

References

Danish bacteriologists
1882 births
1948 deaths
Danish pathologists
Danish parasitologists